Pabna Cadet College, is a military high school, modeled after public schools in the UK (according to the Public Schools Act 1868), financed partially by the Bangladesh Army, located at Jalalpur, east of Pabna town, Bangladesh.  It is renowned for its quality of education provided in all sectors of human necessity.

Overview
Pabna Cadet College boards approximately 300 boys between the ages of 12 and 18 (roughly 50 in each year for grade-7 ) through a nationwide admission test composed of written, viva, physical and medical examinations.

The school is headed by a principal, appointed by the Adjutant General's branch of the Bangladesh Army. It contains three houses, each headed by a housemaster, selected from among the senior members of the teaching staff.

School uniform
All cadets wear a full-sleeve Khaki color uniform in winter and half-sleeve khaki shirt with black pant in summer in academic and administrative hours. For morning PT and afternoon games, gray polo shirts with white half pants are used. For evening activities, a dress of white shirt, black pant and striped tie is used.

History
Bearing the motto "Perseverance Is Success", Pabna Cadet College started its normal activities as a complete institution on 7 August 1981. It was first a residential model school.  Abdul Bashar, the then Principal of Residential Model School, handed over its full control to Syed Salimullah, Project Director and founder Principal of Pabna Cadet College, on 15 May 1981. The college began to run with a total strength of 170 boys of the former residential model school in four classes.

At present there are 319 cadets in six classes from class vii to xii.

Inter cadet college competitions
Pabna Cadet College is actively participating in inter cadet college competitions both sports and cultural sectors.
In the recent Inter cadet college basketball and volleyball meet-2015, PCC has become runners-up in basketball competition. Side by side, this institution has glorious history in football, swimming and other games and sports.
In the biyearly competition the most popular and the most competitive Inter cadet college literary and music meet, this college has the richest history. In ICCLMM 2016, PCC has become champion in literary and in overall position. PCC has unquestionable dominance in the music arena also.

Campus

Location
Pabna Cadet College is located at Jalalpur, Pabna beside the Dhaka-Pabna highway.  It is located six kilometers east of Pabna city, near Bagchipara market.

Infrastructure
Academic Block (Jahangir Bhaban named after Bir Sreshtho Captain Mohiuddin Jahangir) is a modern three storey building which is the centre of teaching activity. The building houses the classrooms, art gallery, computer lab, science labs, language lab, various academic departments, the Vice Principal's Office and the Staff Lounge (staffroom).

House
The three boarding houses (SIRAJI, BHASANI & TITUMITR House) are within  one large three storied building, capable of accommodating 120 cadets in each. The housing complex is secured with a boundary wall and 24-hour guard. Of the Three houses- Bhasani (Blue) has become record 26 times Champion out of 36 Championships. In 2018, the Aristocratic overall Championship is attained by Siraji (Red) House. Titumir (Green) house became the champion of Inter House Cricket Championship 2020.

Cadet Mess
(Bir Sreshtho Matiur Dining Hall named after Bir Sreshtho Flight Lieutenant Matiur Rahman).
It is capable of hosting at least 320 Cadets at a time

Mosque
A beautiful college mosque is there. It is a one storied building and air-conditioned.

Auditorium
Mostofa Auditrium (named after Bir Srestho Sepoy Mostafa Kamal) has a modern stage and audio visual facilities. The two storied building can comfortably seat 450+ persons.

College Hospital
Bir Sreshtha Nur Muhammad Hospital named after Bir Sreshtho Lance Naik Nur Mohammad Sheikh. It is a 17 Bed hospital. There is an isolation room for those who are suffering from contagious disease. Besides, it has a pathology laboratory. 
A Medical Officer from Bangladesh Army Medical Core (equivalent to Captain) is deputed here for the better treatment and take care of the Cadets

College Library
(Bir Sreshtho Rouf Library named after Bir Sreshtho Lance Naik Munshi Abdur Rouf)

Administrative Building
The central office building has two storeys. The Principal's Office, Adjutant's Office, Admin Office, Accounts Office and others are located here. The national and college flags fly in front of this building.

Cadet Canteen
Cadets can purchase essential commodities and dry foods from the cadets' canteen. Cadets are issued monthly coupons as payment. Cadets are not permitted to carry cash. The name of the canteen is shahid cadet iqbal cafeteria.

Residential accommodation
The residential area is located on northern side of Dhaka-Pabna Road. The college provides accommodation to all employees. There is also a two storied block to provide accommodation for unmarried male staff members.

Others
Generator Room and Electric Power Station
Pump House
Vehicle Shed
Dhobi and Tailor Shop
Dairy Farm

Academics
The academic situation of this renowned cadet college is well known in Bangladesh. It scores A+ in both public exam SSC, HSC of Bangladesh. It is consecutively winning the chairman's trophy of the governing bodies of cadet colleges for its academic excellence in the board exams.

Gymnasium
There is a small gym in front of the Heron point naming 'Fitness Hut'.

Administration
Administration key figures include a principal (a Lt. Colonel ranking officer from Army/Navy/Air Force or a very senior faculty teacher), a vice principal (a very senior faculty teacher), an adjutant (an Army major), a medical officer (a captain/major from the Army Medical Core), and three house masters and faculty teachers. The administrative system surrounds the principal. The principal is the key figure in the administrative system. He/she plays main role in every administrative situation. The vice principal is the main head of academic activities. He/she is the main responsible person to administer and maintain academics activities. The adjutant is the head of disciplinary section. He/she also contributes to the overall administrative system as an auxiliary hand of the principal. Medical officer remains concerned about the medical issues both cadets/officers/employees. The house master is the person who shoulders overall responsibility of separate house.

References

External links
 Official Pabna Cadet College Site

Military high schools
1981 establishments in Bangladesh
Cadet colleges in Bangladesh
Organisations based in Pabna
Educational Institutions affiliated with Bangladesh Army
Educational institutions established in 1981